Louis Cheslock (September 25, 1898 – July 19, 1981) was a British-born American violinist, composer and author. He taught at the Peabody Institute in Baltimore, Maryland for six decades.

Early life
Cheslock was born on September 25, 1898 in London. His parents were Polish immigrants, and Cheslock immigrated to the United States with them in 1901. He later became a U.S. citizen. He attended the Peabody Institute in Baltimore, Maryland, where he learned how to play the violin and took harmony and composition courses.

Career
Cheslock taught at his alma mater, the Peabody Institute, for six decades. He composed "concertos, tone poems, symphonies, a ballet and an opera" and authored three books. His compositions were performed domestically and internationally, including in Belgium, India, Israel, Portugal, and Singapore.

Cheslock was a member of H. L. Mencken's Saturday Night Club from the 1920s to the 1950s.

Personal life and death
With his wife, née Elise Hanline, Cheslock had a son, Barry.

Cheslock died of a heart attack on July 19, 1981 in Baltimore, Maryland.

Selected works

References

1898 births
1981 deaths
English people of Polish descent
People with acquired American citizenship
People from Baltimore
Peabody Institute faculty
English violinists
American male violinists
20th-century American violinists
English male composers
20th-century English composers
American male composers
20th-century American composers
20th-century American male musicians
British emigrants to the United States